Xylopia staudtii Engl & Diels is a tall tree within the Annonaceae family, it can grow up to 50 meters tall, the tallest height of the African Xylopia trees. It occurs in forest and freshwater swamps in West Africa.

Description 
The species has a straight and slender trunk with branching stilts roots and sometimes stilted peg-roots or pneumatophores, its diameter as measured by the d.b.h. can be up to 80 cm. Larger, somewhat leathery and discolourous leaf blades, paler abaxially, measures between 5.1 -11.8 long and 2.0 - 5.6 cm wide. Leaf-blades are oblanceolate to obovate and sometimes elliptical outlined, blunt to acuminate apex, cuneate at the base, and decurrent on petiole. Fruits, up to 5 borne on a pedicel, green exterior and scarlet interior, oblong shaped, thick walled and sparsely pubescent to glabrate.

Distribution 
Occurs in West and Central Africa in high forest or swampy forest zones. Species is widely spread in the Takamanda Reserve in Cameroun.

Uses 
Locals use stem bark extracts to treat dysentery in Cameroun and cold in Côte d'Ivoire.

References 

Flora of West Tropical Africa
Xylopia